Deadline at Dawn is a 1946 American film noir, the only film directed by stage director Harold Clurman. It was written by Clifford Odets and based on a novel of the same name by Cornell Woolrich (as William Irish). The RKO Pictures film release was the only cinematic collaboration between Clurman and his former Group Theatre associate, screenwriter Odets. The director of photography was RKO regular Nicholas Musuraca. The musical score was by German refugee composer Hanns Eisler.

Plot
U.S. Navy sailor Alex Winkley (Bill Williams) wakes up from a night of drinking in New York City and finds he has a wad of cash. His memory is hazy, but he knows he got it from a woman he had visited earlier in the evening, Edna Bartelli (Lola Lane).

With the help of dance-hall girl June Goffe (Susan Hayward), he attempts to return the money, only to find out that the woman is dead.  The sailor is not sure if he is the killer or not. Alex and June, along with a philosophical cabbie (Paul Lukas), stay up all night, attempting to solve the murder mystery before the sailor has to catch a bus to the naval base in Norfolk, Virginia, in the morning. Their deadline is at dawn.

During the film, the many false leads and red herrings involve a blind piano player named Sleepy Parsons (Marvin Miller) and a young couple.

Bartelli had been blackmailing men with whom she had had affairs, thus many suspects are possible. The woman's brother Val (Joseph Calleia) adds a touch of menace to the plot. The surprise ending resolves all issues, including the relationship between Alex and June.

Cast

Production
Richard Fleischer says that Sid Rogell, head of RKO's B Picture unit, bullied Harold Clurman during production meetings, saying he would "kick the director right in the balls". He says Clurman accepted it without complaint.

The dialogue contains Odets' trademark New York wisecracks. For example, while dancing at club early in the movie, the Hayward character likens the dance hall to a post office, filled with second-class matter. Edna Bartelli greets her ex-husband by saying, "Aren't you dead yet?"

There are many "slice of life" characterizations of big city people in small roles, such as a tired banana salesman, an angry building superintendent, a refugee with a skin condition who has a crush on June, and a wisecracking sidewalk pitchman.

Odets' Group Theatre colleague Roman Bohnen appears in a bit part, as a grief-stricken man with a dying cat.

Reception

Critical response
Film critic Dennis Schwartz somewhat liked the film, writing, "Broadway's Harold Clurman takes his only stab at film directing, after the breakup of his Group Theatre, in this odd psychological thriller noted for its flowery dialogue and muddled story line ... It's penned by playwright Clifford Odets from a story by Cornell Woolrich. Though enjoyable by virtue of its distorted mise-en-scène, affection for NYC characters and its misplaced chatter, this is not art but run-of-the-mill film noir. Set in Manhattan, yet Deadline used no location shots but was filmed entirely in the studio's back lots. Cinematographer Nick Musuraca does a fine job creating an atmospheric scene of NYC's downtrodden and unhappy souls roaming the dark streets."

Home media
Warner Bros. released the film on DVD on July 13, 2010, in its Film Noir Classic Collection, Vol. 5.

References

External links 
 
 
 
 

1946 films
1940s mystery thriller films
1940s psychological thriller films
American mystery thriller films
American black-and-white films
Film noir
Films based on American novels
Films set in New York City
RKO Pictures films
Films based on works by Cornell Woolrich
1946 directorial debut films
1940s English-language films
1940s American films